Rizwan Butt is a Pakistani singer-songwriter and musician. He is best known as a lead vocalist and guitarist of music reality series Nescafé Basement. With the career over decade Butt has collaborated with many artists as their music director and debut as a singer in 2012. He marked his Coke Studio debut as a featured artist in season 9, as a part team Shani Arshad.

Filmography
ACTOR 2007

Discography
 "Gharoli"
 "Ali Maula"
 "Tere Ishq Mein"
 "Bhangi"
 "Piya Tori Yaad"
 "Inteha-e-Ishq"

References

External links
 
  
 Rizawan Butt at Nescafé Basement

Pakistani pop singers
Pakistani classical singers
Pakistani rock guitarists
Living people
Singers from Lahore
Year of birth missing (living people)